Keith Gary Sebelius (born November 8, 1949), known professionally as K. Gary Sebelius or Gary Sebelius, is a former magistrate judge and a former federal judicial nominee to the United States District Court for the District of Kansas.  He is the husband of former United States Secretary of Health and Human Services Kathleen Sebelius and also served as the First Gentleman of Kansas from 2003 to 2009, while his wife was governor.

Early life and education
Sebelius was born in Norton, Kansas, the son of Elizabeth Adeline (née Roberts) and Keith George Sebelius, a United States congressman from Kansas. Sebelius earned a bachelor's degree magna cum laude from Kansas State University in 1971 and a J.D. degree from Georgetown University Law Center in 1974.

Professional career
Before becoming a judge, Sebelius had a long career as a lawyer in Topeka, Kansas.  He worked as an associate at the law firm of Eidson, Lewis, Porter & Haynes from 1974 until 1979, and then served as a partner at the firm from 1979 until 1989.  From 1989 until 1993, Sebelius was a partner at the firm of Davis, Wright, Unrein, Hummer & McCallister.  Sebelius then worked as a partner at the Topeka law firm Wright, Henson, Somers, Sebelius, Clark & Baker from 1993 until 2003.  During his time in private practice, Sebelius became best known for defending the Topeka Board of Education in the reopened Brown v. Board of Education case in federal court.

Failed nomination to district court
On June 6, 2000, President Bill Clinton nominated Sebelius to be a judge on the United States District Court for the District of Kansas to fill the vacancy created by the decision by Judge George Thomas Van Bebber to take senior status.  However, with the United States Senate controlled by Republicans, many of Clinton's judicial nominations languished.  In particular, Sebelius' nomination was reported to have been held up by Kansas Sen. Sam Brownback.  President George W. Bush later successfully appointed Julie A. Robinson to the seat to which Sebelius had been nominated.

Work as a U.S. magistrate judge
On August 16, 2002, the judges on the United States District Court for the District of Kansas appointed Sebelius to an eight-year term as a United States magistrate judge.  Sebelius began hearing cases in February 2003 and was formally sworn in on June 11, 2003. He retired from the bench on February 20, 2019.

Personal
Sebelius married his wife, Kathleen Sebelius on New Year's Eve 1974. They have two sons.

References

1949 births
Living people
20th-century American lawyers
21st-century American judges
First Ladies and Gentlemen of Kansas
Georgetown University Law Center alumni
Kansas lawyers
Kansas State University alumni
People from Norton, Kansas
United States magistrate judges